Oberkassel is a suburb in the Bonn municipal district of Beuel and lies on the right bank of the Rhine on the edge of the Siebengebirge mountains. Oberkassel has about 7,200 inhabitants.

History 
In 1914, workers in a quarry detected a grave with a 50-year-old man, a 20-25-year-old woman and a dog. Carbon-14 datings estimated an age between 13,300 and 14,000 years. A study of the mitochondrial genome sequences in 2013 showed that the animal is indeed Canis lupus familiaris, not a wolf.

Oberkassel was first mentioned as Cassele in 722/723 and as Cassela in 1144. The name Oberkassel refers to a Roman fortification; in the course of time "Romerkastell" (Roman castle) became "Oberkassel". Oberkassel absorbed the previously separate settlements of Berghoven (mentioned for the first time in 873), Büchel (mentioned for the first time in 1202), Broich (mentioned for the first time in 1306) and Meerhausen (mentioned for the first time in 1442).

In 1870 the East Rhine Railway reached Oberkassel and crossed the Rhine by train ferry to the West Rhine Railway. The train ferry was abandoned 1919.

Transport

Bonn-Oberkassel station is on the East Rhine Railway.

The Bonn Stadtbahn (city rail of Bonn) with its lines 62 and 66 serves three stations in Oberkassel: Oberkassel Nord (SWB), Oberkassel Mitte and Oberkassel Süd/Römlinghoven.

It has an exit near .

Economy

Oberkassel is home of several divisions of the DLR, the German Aerospace Center.

Notable residents
 Gottfried Kinkel, * August 11, 1815 in Oberkassel, † 13 November 1882, poet also noted for his revolutionary activities
 Ernest, Count of Lippe-Biesterfeld, * 9 June 1842 in Oberkassel, † 26 September 1904, head of the Lippe-Biesterfeld line of the House of Lippe, regent of the Principality of Lippe

Gallery

References

External links
Heimatverein (historical society) www.heimatverein-oberkassel.de 

Urban districts and boroughs of Bonn
Former municipalities in North Rhine-Westphalia